Loxophlebia davisi is a moth of the subfamily Arctiinae. It was described by A. E. Gibbs in 1913. It is found in Honduras.

References

Loxophlebia
Moths described in 1913